James Porter (April 18, 1787 – February 7, 1839) was a United States representative from New York. He was born in Williamstown, Massachusetts on April 18, 1787. He graduated from Williams College in 1810, studied law, was admitted to the bar and commenced practice in Skaneateles, New York.

Porter was a member of the New York State Assembly, and was elected as a Democratic-Republican to the Fifteenth Congress (March 4, 1817 – March 3, 1819). He was not a candidate for renomination, and resumed the practice of law. He served as surrogate of Onondaga County, then moved to Albany and served as register of the court of chancery until his death there February 7, 1839. His interment was in Greenwood Cemetery in Brooklyn, New York.

References

External links 
 

1787 births
1839 deaths
Williams College alumni
People from Williamstown, Massachusetts
People from Skaneateles, New York
Politicians from Albany, New York
Burials at Green-Wood Cemetery
Democratic-Republican Party members of the United States House of Representatives from New York (state)
19th-century American politicians
Lawyers from Albany, New York
19th-century American lawyers